Couple and Family Psychology: Research and Practice is a quarterly peer-reviewed academic journal published by the American Psychological Association on behalf of their Division 43. The journal covers all aspects of family psychology. It was established in 2011 and the editor-in-chief is Thomas L. Sexton (Indiana University). The journal is abstracted and indexed in PsycINFO.

External links 
 

American Psychological Association academic journals
English-language journals
Quarterly journals
Family therapy journals
Publications established in 2011